Tommy Haas defeated Max Mirnyi in the final, 6–2, 6–2, 6–2 to win the singles tennis title at the 2001 Eurocard Open.

Wayne Ferreira was the defending champion, but lost in the quarterfinals to Lleyton Hewitt.

Seeds
All seeds receive a bye into the second round.

Draw

Finals

Top half

Section 1

Section 2

Bottom half

Section 3

Section 4

Qualifying

Seeds

Qualifiers

Draw

First qualifier

Second qualifier

Third qualifier

Fourth qualifier

Fifth qualifier

Sixth qualifier

References
General

Men's Singles
Stuttgart Masters Singles